Crash Override: How Gamergate (Nearly) Destroyed My Life, and How We Can Win the Fight Against Online Hate is a memoir by indie video game developer Zoë Quinn about their experiences as the target of Gamergate and in countering online abuse.

Reception 

Critics praised what they described as Quinn's honest and sober outlook in the face of harassment. Kirkus Reviews wrote that the book's presentation was sometimes scattered in switching between personal anecdote and online safety advice.

The book was nominated for the 2018 Hugo Award for Best Related Work (i.e., non-fiction work related to science fiction or fantasy).

References

Further reading

External links 

 

2017 non-fiction books
American memoirs
Books about video games
English-language books
Gamergate (harassment campaign)
PublicAffairs books
Works about cyberbullying